The Minister of Industry, Economic Development and Mines is a former ministerial position in the province of Manitoba, Canada.

The position was created in 1999 as the Ministry of Industry, Trade and Mines, taking in responsibilities from other departments. Its name was changed in 2003.

The department was eliminated in 2006, and most of its responsibilities were shifted to the new Ministry of Competitiveness, Training and Trade. Some responsibilities were shifted to the Ministry of Science, Technology, Energy and Mines.

List of Ministers of Industry, Economic Development and Mines

References 

Industry, Economic Development and Mines, Minister of